The Naticinae are a subfamily of medium to large-sized predatory sea snails, marine gastropod molluscs in the family Naticidae, the moon snails. 

The Naticinae are characterized by their calcareous operculum and by the presence of a distinct funicle within the umbilicus, which is observable in most species. It is mainly a tropical group, which is brightly colored and patterned.

Genera
Genera within the subfamily Naticinae include:
 Cochlis Röding, 1798
 Cryptonatica Dall, 1892
 Natica, the type genus
 Naticarius Duméril, 1805
 Notocochlis Powell, 1933
 Paratectonatica Azuma, 1961
 Proxiuber Powell, 1933
 Stigmaulax Mörch, 1852
 Tanea Marwick, 1931
 † Taniella Finlay & Marwick, 1937 
 Tasmatica Finlay & Marwick, 1937
 Tectonatica Sacco, 1890
Genera brought into synonymy
 Aloconatica Shikama, 1971: synonym of Stigmaulax Mörch, 1852
 Boreonatica Golikov & Kussakin, 1974: synonym of Cryptonatica Dall, 1892 (junior objective synonym of Cryptonatica)
 Glyphepithema Rehder, 1943: synonym of Natica Scopoli, 1777
 Lunaia S. S. Berry, 1964: synonym of Natica Scopoli, 1777
 Nacca Risso, 1826: synonym of Natica Scopoli, 1777
 Naticus Montfort, 1810: synonym of Naticarius Duméril, 1805
 Pristinacca Finlay & Marwick, 1937: synonym of † Taniella Finlay & Marwick, 1937 
 Quantonatica Iredale, 1936: synonym of Naticarius Duméril, 1805
 Sulconatica Golikov & Kussakin, 1974: synonym of Cryptonatica Dall, 1892

References

 Marincovich, L.N. (1977) Cenozoic Naticidae (Mollusca: Gastropoda) of the Northeastern Pacific. Bulletins of American Paleontology, 70, 169-212.
 Kabat, A.R. (1991) The classification of the Naticidae (Mollusca: Gastropoda): Review and analysis of the supraspecific taxa. Bull. Mus. Comp. Zool., 152, 417-449.

External links
 Bouchet, P. & Rocroi, J.-P. (2005). Classification and nomenclator of gastropod families. Malacologia. 47 (1-2): 1-397
 Huelsken, T. et al. (2008) The Naticidae (Mollusca: Gastropoda) of Isola del Giglio (Tuscany, Italy): Shell characters, live animals, and a molecular analysis of egg masses. Zootaxa, 1770, 1-40.

Naticidae